Think of Me may refer to:

 "Think of Me" (Andrew Lloyd Webber song), a song from the 1986 musical The Phantom of the Opera
 "Think of Me" (Buck Owens song), 1966
 "Think of Me" (Koo De Tah song), 1986
 "Think of Me" (The Veronicas song), 2019
 Think of Me (film), a 1996 Cuban film
 "Think of Me", a song by Madonna from the 1983 album Madonna
 "Think of Me/No More Tears", a 2001 single by Namie Amuro